The men's tournament of basketball at the 2009 Summer Universiade at Belgrade, Serbia began on July 2 and ended on July 11.

Teams

Format
 26 participating team are drawn into six groups of three teams (A, C, D, E, G, H) and two groups of four teams (B, F). Each group will use the single round robin system.
 1st and 2nd placed teams of each group from the preliminary will be divided into four groups (I, J, K, L) of four teams. Each group will use the single round robin system. The results of the games between the two teams involved in the preliminary will be carried over.
 The 3rd and 4th placed teams of each group from the preliminary will be divided into two groups (M, N) of three teams each and one group (O) of four teams. The results of the games between the two teams involved in the preliminary will be carried over.
 Competitions for 17th–26th place will be conducted as follows:
 1st placed team of groups M, N and O will play each other for 17th–19th places.
 2nd placed team of groups M, N and O will play each other for 20th–22nd places.
 3rd and 4th placed teams of groups M, N and O will play each other for 23rd–26th places. The results of the games between the two teams involved in the second phase will be carried over.
 1st and 2nd placed teams of each of the four groups I, J, K, L from the second phase will be divided into four games (Q, R, S, T) of two teams for Quarterfinals. 
 The 3rd placed teams of the four groups (I, J, K, L) will enter into a four-team classification playoff for 9th–12th places.
 The 4th placed teams of the four groups (I, J, K, L) will enter into a four-team classification playoff for 13th–16th places.
 In the quarterfinals, the matchups are as follows: Q (1I vs. 2L), R (1J vs. 2K), S (1K vs. 2J) and T (1L vs. 2I).
 The winning teams of the four games (Q, R, S, T) from the quarterfinals will enter into a four-team classification playoff for 1st–4th places.
 The losing teams of the four games from the quarterfinals will enter into a four-team classification playoff for 5th–8th places.
 The winning teams from the semifinals contest the gold medal. The losing teams contest the bronze.

Tie-breaking criteria:
 Head to head results
 Goal average (not the goal difference) between the tied teams
 Goal average of the tied teams for all teams in its group

Note: all times are CEST

Preliminary round

Group A

Group B

Group C

Group D

Group E

Group F

Group G

Group H

Intermediate Round

Group I

Group J

Group K

Group L

Intermediate Round 17-25 Places

Group M

Group N

Group O

Classification round

Classification 23-25 places

Classification 20-22 places

Classification 17-19 places

Classification 13-16 places

Classification 9-12 places

Tournament bracket

Quarterfinals

Semifinals

Classification 5-8 places

Finals

Final 15-16 places

Final 13-14 places

Final 11-12 places

Final 9-10 places

Final 7-8 places

Final 5-6 places

Bronze-medal game

Final

Final standings

External links
Reports

Basketball at the 2009 Summer Universiade